Iga Świątek defeated Aryna Sabalenka in the final, 6–2, 6–2 to win the singles tennis title at the 2022 Women's Stuttgart Open. By winning her fourth consecutive title, Świątek extended her winning streak to 23 matches.

Ashleigh Barty was the defending champion, but she announced her retirement from professional tennis in March 2022.

Seeds 
The top four seeds received a bye into the second round.

Draw

Finals

Top half

Bottom half

Qualifying

Seeds

Qualifiers

Lucky loser

Qualifying draw

First qualifier

Second qualifier

Third qualifier

Fourth qualifier

References

External links 
 Main draw
 Qualifying draw

2022 Porsche Tennis Grand Prix - 1
2022 WTA Tour